Baildon is a town and civil parish in the Bradford Metropolitan Borough in West Yorkshire, England and within the historic boundaries of the West Riding of Yorkshire.

The town forms a continuous urban area with Shipley and Bradford, and is part of the West Yorkshire Built Up Area.
Other nearby suburbs include Shipley to the south and Saltaire to the west.
As of the 2011 census, the Baildon ward has a population of 15,360.

History 

Baildon is known to have been inhabited for many centuries; several cup-and-ring stones on Baildon Moor has shown evidence of Bronze Age inhabitation.
Baildon Moor has a number of gritstone outcrops with numerous prehistoric cup and ring marks.
A denuded and mutilated bank represents the remains of an Iron Age settlement known as Soldier's Trench, sometimes mistaken for a Bronze Age stone circle.
A Bronze Age cup-marked rock is incorporated in the bank.

Baildon is recorded as Beldone and Beldune in the Domesday Book.
In 1066 it belonged to a Gospatric, son of Arnketil, and had passed to Erneis of Buron by 1086.

Baildon had two manor houses: one on Hall Cliffe, the other in lower Baildon.
In the 1960s, the Hall Cliffe house was demolished and replaced with the Ian Clough Hall.

During the Industrial Revolution, Baildon developed a woollen industry; Westgate House was built in 1814 by the Ambler family who were prominent in the wool trade and the warehouse part of the building was Feathers Bakery now Nine Café adjacent to the mill which is now the Westgate Bar.

During the 19th and early 20th centuries, conditions in Bradford deteriorated and poverty and ill health became widespread; Baildon began developing as a commuter town along with neighbouring Shipley.
In the latter years of the 20th century, the West Riding suffered from economic decline through the gradual closure of its textile and engineering industries.
Bradford was particularly affected by this; however, Leeds grew as a major administrative and financial centre and Baildon with its railway links to Leeds has become a strategic commuter town.

Gypsy parties 

Baildon was an important location for the British Gypsy community.
A report of 1929 stated that annual Gypsy Parties had started two to three hundred years before – records were said to go back to 1770 when it was reported to be an ancient custom.
In 1881, up to 5,000 people are said to have paid for admission.
Gradually the event was taken over by local residents, who dressed up as Gypsies and formed 'tribes'.
Proceeds went to the local Horticultural Society.
After 1897 the tradition died out, apparently because the 'real Gypsies' had disappeared.
However, in 1929 it was revived to raise funds for Baildon Hospital.
A local resident, John Keen, then contacted the so-called King of the Gypsies, Xavier Petulengro, and they re-established large Gypsy gatherings at Baildon, recorded on Pathe News films and shown nationally in cinemas.
The Gypsy Parties ended with the start of the Second World War and were never revived.
However, in the early 1990s travellers used the Bank Holiday loophole to occupy Shipley Glen in Baildon for a weekend festival.

Pleasure Grounds 

In northern Shipley off Prod Lane there was a small fairground with dodgem cars, booths and a historic "Aerial Glide" suspended roller coaster that for a short period had listed building status.
In earlier years the fairground attractions at Shipley Glen were much more extensive.
The fairground closed and is now dismantled and newly built (2015/6) private housing now covers the site.
The only working remnant of the Pleasure Grounds is the Shipley Glen Cable Tramway a funicular railway carrying passengers from just north of Roberts Park, Saltaire up the hill side through Walker Wood to the location of the Pleasure Grounds at the top of Prod Lane.

Geography 

Baildon lies to the north east of Bradford, and is linked to Bradford and Shipley by the B6151.
To the north of Baildon lies Baildon Moor, a part of Rombalds Moor, with several quarries and underlying strata of coal.
There are the remains of old coal pits.

Across Baildon Moor is the village of Menston, the town of Ilkley and Ilkley Moor.
Baildon is situated on a hill to the north of the River Aire and the Leeds and Liverpool Canal.

Governance 

History

Boards of Guardians were formed as a result of the Poor Law Amendment Act 1834 though the Baildon Local Board of Guardians was formed in 1852.
Elections were held on 16 September 1852, and their first quorate meeting was on 9 October 1852. The last meeting took place on 18 December 1894.
As a result of the Local Government Act 1894 Baildon became an urban district on 1 January 1895 and was then administered by Baildon Urban District Council, which was established in 1895 and was disbanded when Bradford Metropolitan District Council was established in 1974.

Present day

A group of local residents held an open meeting on 7 May 1997 and as a result the Baildon Community Council came into being on 26 June 1997 as a means of communicating local interest to appropriate authorities.
Residents of Baildon went through the appropriate legal process and as a result Baildon Parish Council was formed which held its first full meeting 14 May 2007.
The civil parish does not cover nearby Esholt, part of the Baildon Ward at District level, but includes the area North of the River Aire along Coach Road and Higher Coach Road (Baildon South West) which is within the Shipley Ward at District level.

On Monday 10 June 2013 Baildon officially became a town when Baildon Parish Council resolved that, in accordance with the Local Government Act 1972 s245, the Parish of Baildon shall have the status of a town.
Consequently, the Parish Council was renamed Baildon Town Council.

Councillors

Baildon ward is represented on Bradford Council by three Conservative councillors, Valerie Townend, Mike Pollard and Debbie Davies.

 indicates seat up for re-election.

Economy 

Baildon has a modest town centre with most everyday amenities including independent traders, estate agents and family law solicitors.

There is a Co-op supermarket and a small Tesco on the outskirts.
The centre is home to many independent shops including Pickles Delicatessen, Westgate General Stores, Seasons Home, Finesse Gifts and Baildon Interiors.
There are also several independently owned hair dressers and beauty salons and a variety of restaurants and take-aways.
There are some eight public houses and bars in Baildon.

Charlestown 

Charlestown in south east Baildon is the area of Baildon with the highest concentration of industry.
The area is in the valley bottom between Otley Road and the River Aire, and includes the Acorn Park Industrial Estate and the Butterfield Industrial Estate. Notable companies established in Charlestown include Manor Coating Systems and Denso Marston Radiators.

Further north east in Charlestown there are plans for a 'Baildon Business Park' and hotel on a green field site near Buck Lane, at a cost of £25 million but there is opposition to the move.
Another industrial area is the Tong Park Industrial Estate off Otley Road in eastern Baildon.

Landmarks 
One of the main monuments in Baildon is the Frances Ferrand memorial fountain, known locally as the 'potted meat stick'.
This was built by Baron Amphlett of Somerset as a memorial to his mother-in-law, Frances Ferrand.
It still stands today to the eastern side of Browgate.
In 1925 the monument was put at threat when plans were produced to replace in with a bus terminus.
In the 1960s the monument was removed and dismantled; however, in 1986 the Mechanics Institute raised funds to take it out of storage and restore it.
To the north of Towngate roundabout in front of Glendale House is a concrete paved open area created in the 1960s containing what remains of the stocks and a sandstone pillar thought to be the remains of a mediaeval cross, both Grade II listed.
On Glen Road on the edge of Baildon Moor, close to Shipley Glen, is Bracken Hall Countryside Centre and Museum, a free-to-visit children's museum, natural history education centre and nature centre.

Baildon's War Memorials are situated on Browgate
and in Tong Park.

North of Upper Coach Road in Shipley is Shipley Glen Tramway, a narrow-gauge funicular railway. The railway takes passengers between the valley floor near Titus Salt School to the bottom of Prod Lane, a short walking distance from Shipley Glen.

Churches 

The Church of St. James in Charlestown is a painted tongue and groove timber building, now a grade II listed building.
It was moved to Baildon from Great Warley, Essex in 1905.
The Reverend N. R. Bailey, rector of Great Warley, had property in Baildon and hoped to retire there.
However his obituary was published in November 1900 before he retired.
In 2007/2008 the church was moved again, but only by a few yards.
This allowed the surrounding land to be sold by the Diocese for development.
Rotten timbers were replaced and underground heat pump system installed to make the building more eco-friendly.

The Church of St. John the Evangelist designed by Mallinson & Healey, was built in 1848 though the south tower was not added until 1928.
The east window designed by Powell & Sons was added in 1870.

Transport 

The village is served by Baildon railway station on the electrified Wharfedale Line with connections to Bradford Forster Square and Ilkley.
There is however, no service to Leeds owing to its position on the curve between the two lines.
Passengers must instead change at Shipley or the nearby Guiseley (Shipley having more services).
Baildon is served by the West Yorkshire Metro 626, 649, and 656–659 First and Yorkshire Tiger bus services.
The main road through Baildon is the A6038 Otley Road while the B6151 Baildon Road / Brow Gate goes the short distance from Otley Road up to Browgate roundabout.

Education 

There were a large number of First and Middle schools in the area, including Ferniehurst First School, Tong Park First School, Belmont Middle School & Ladderbanks Middle School, before the 1998 Bradford Education reform which returned the area to a two-tier school system.
Currently, there are four local primary schools: Sandal Primary School to the North on West Lane, Baildon Church of England School to the east off Langley Lane, Hoyle Court Primary school in Charlestown and Glenaire Primary School to the south on Thompson Lane.

The nearest secondary school for the area is Titus Salt School on Higher Coach Road, overlooking Roberts Park, Saltaire. There is dispute as to which town the school actually is in, some classing it as Baildon and some as Saltaire

Sport 

Within Baildon there are sports clubs for cricket, football, golf, rugby and running.

Culture and events 

For nearly a quarter of a century the August bank holiday weekend saw over 500 Harley-Davidson riders arrive in Baildon as part of the annual UK rally of the Harley-Davidson Riders Club of Great Britain fundraising rally.
The HDRCGB ran the rally up to 2001 when it moved to Berkshire.
In 2003, Harley-Davidson's Centenary Year, the HDRCGB hosted the event for the last time in Baildon.
The rally is now organised by the Shipley Harley-Davidson Club.
In 2008 430 riders were given a police escort down Browgate towards Hollins Hill, from where most riders travelled to Harewood House.

Cultural references

Film and television 

 Billy Liar (1963) – Locations: Midland Road; Hinchliffe Avenue (Number 37 is the Fisher household)
 Monty Python's The Meaning of Life (1983) – Locations: Baildon Moor
 Damon & Debbie (1987) – Locations: St Anne's Terrace; Threshfield
 Rita, Sue & Bob Too (1987) – Locations: Bramham Drive (Number 5 is Bob's House); Baildon Moor; Baildon Village.
 Where The Heart Is (1997) – Locations: Ferniehurst First School, Cliffe Lane West & Baildon Green

Music 

 British music duo Aquilo (band) refer to Baildon in their 2015 song Good Girl
 Baildon Moor is mentioned in the song LS43 by New Model Army
Baildon Orchestra is an amateur orchestra which was formed in the mid 1940s and still meets on a weekly basis throughout the year. website baildonorchestra.weebly.com

Notable people 

The late journalist and Countdown TV game show presenter Richard Whiteley was a native of Baildon,
and Austin Mitchell, Labour Member of Parliament (MP) for Great Grimsby from 1977 until 2015, was born in Baildon. The former wool merchant and RAF Officer Geoffrey Ambler was born in Baildon in 1904.

Mountaineer Ian Clough was born in Baildon.
After he was killed on an expedition to the Himalayan mountain Annapurna in 1970, Ian Clough Hall, a meeting-place and arts venue, was established in Baildon in his memory.
In 1962, Clough and Bonington were the first Britons to successfully scale the treacherous north face of the Eiger in the Swiss Alps.
Ex-Yorkshire & England cricket captain Brian Close, born in nearby Rawdon, settled in the village, and died there in 2015 after a long battle with cancer.
Ex-Yorkshire and England cricket fast bowler Matthew Hoggard, though originally from Pudsey, lived in Baildon for some years and was a member of Baildon Cricket Club.
The explorer James Theodore Bent (1852–1897) spent his boyhood at Baildon House on Station Road. Family memorials are to be found in St John's church. Geoffrey Brindley, known locally as the Jesus Man of Bradford lived in Baildon until his death in 2015 and there were plans to erect a statue of him in the town.

See also
Listed buildings in Baildon

References

External links 

 Baildon Online Baildon Online Community Website
 Baildon Village website Website initiated by Baildon Community Council
 
 
 Baildon Town Council details and documents related to the activities of Baildon Town Council. Includes Heritage Trail booklets in the Documents section

Towns in West Yorkshire
Wards of Bradford
Geography of the City of Bradford
Civil parishes in West Yorkshire